Berkshire County Cricket Club was established on 17 March 1895. It has since played minor counties cricket from 1895 and played List A cricket from 1965 to 2005, using a different number of home grounds during that time. Their first home minor counties fixture in 1895 was against Hertfordshire at Reading School Ground, while their first home List A match came seventy years later against Somerset in the 1965 Gillette Cup at Church Road, Reading. The now defunct County Ground in Reading has held the most Minor Counties Championship fixtures for Berkshire.

The thirty grounds that Berkshire have used for home matches since 1895 are listed below, with statistics complete through to the end of the 2014 season.

Grounds

List A
Below is a complete list of grounds used by Berkshire County Cricket Club when it was permitted to play List A matches. These grounds have also held Minor Counties Championship and MCCA Knockout Trophy matches.

Minor Counties
Below is a complete list of grounds used by Berkshire County Cricket Club in Minor Counties Championship and MCCA Knockout Trophy matches.

Notes

References

Berkshire County Cricket Club
Cricket grounds in Berkshire
Berkshire